Dimitrie Cantemir was a prince of Moldavia and man of letters.

Two educational institutions bear his name:
 Dimitrie Cantemir Christian University in Romania
 Dimitrie Cantemir Lyceum in Chișinău, Moldova

Dimitrie Cantemir may also refer to three places in Romania, all named after him:

 Dimitrie Cantemir, Vaslui, a commune in Vaslui County and his birthplace
 Dimitrie Cantemir, a village in Avrămeni Commune, Botoșani County
 Dimitrie Cantemir, a village in Izvoarele, Giurgiu Commune, Giurgiu County